Joey Restaurant Group is a Western Canadian premium casual restaurant chain based in Vancouver, British Columbia, Canada. The Joey chain of restaurants was founded by Jeff Fuller.  Joey restaurants are a part of a chain of family-owned restaurants, expanding throughout North America. The restaurant focuses on Asian, American, Mediterranean and other global dishes. The company operates 27 full-service restaurants in Canada and the United States. All Joey restaurants feature a bar area and serve alcoholic beverages.

History

Founding and early years 
The first JOEY Restaurant was opened in 1992 in Calgary, Alberta.  The chain now operates over twenty-five restaurants.

The company's founding President and CEO is Jeff Fuller, son of restaurateur Leroy "Bus" Fuller (1928-2019), who founded the Earls restaurant chain with Jeff's brother Stan Fuller. Leroy Fuller was an experienced restaurateur who built the family restaurant empire stemming from one of the original A&W Restaurant franchises in Canada, an American chain of fast-food restaurants known for draft root beers, floats and burgers.

JOEY was originally conceived as a pasta house called "Joey Tomato's", which opened in Calgary in 1992 as a casual pasta and pizza joint. As more menu items were added, eight years later, the name was changed to "Joey Tomato's Mediterranean Grill," before being shortened in 2005 to simply "JOEY." Executive Chef, Chris Mills, began adding Asian cuisine to the menu as a way to rebrand the image. The company also owns the American restaurant Cucina, Cucina.

In 2016, Al Jessa was promoted to company President, marking another link between the Earls chain and JOEY.  Al Jessa's twin brother Mo Jessa is the current president of Earls. 

As of March 2020, Al Jessa is President Emeritus and Layne Krienke, former COO, was promoted to president.

Locations

Canada 
There are 23 locations based in Canada: Calgary, Edmonton, Winnipeg, Kelowna, Ottawa, Toronto and Vancouver.

United States 
The restaurant chain currently has locations in California, Washington state and one in Texas. Locations in California include Woodland Hills, Manhattan Beach and Downtown Los Angeles. The locations in Washington state include Bellevue, Tukwila and Seattle. The Texas location is in Houston.

One location closed down in the Seattle South Lake Union area in November 2013, opening a new location in Seattle's University Village shortly after. The previous location fell victim to traffic and construction congestion in the area.

The newer Joey location based in Seattle is called JOEY Kitchen, the only one of its kind serving test kitchen items. Test kitchen items include dishes and drinks only offered through this specific restaurant, expanding to other locations throughout Canada and the United States if enjoyed by guests. The location was designed by Olson Kundig.

On July 31, 2019, another location opened up in Downtown Los Angeles named JOEY DTLA. The location joins in with other diverse businesses as part of The Bloc community.

On March 4, 2021, JOEY MANHATTAN BEACH opened up. This location is inside the village.

On July 28, 2021, JOEY UPTOWN opened outside the Houston Galleria in Texas. 

The restaurant chain planned to open a new location in the Fashion Island shopping mall in Newport Beach, California in December 2022.

Other restaurants

Local Public Eatery 
The JOEY Restaurant Group is an umbrella company to Earls as well as Local. Local is a casual take with bar food and cheaper menu options.

Earls 
Restaurant founder, Leroy Earl "Bus" Fuller, died at the age of 90. Earls has since been operated by Jeff Fuller's brother, Stan Fuller, who also owns a large share of the Cactus Club chain, a competitor to the restaurant.

Saltlik 
Brother of Jeff and Stan Fuller, Stewart Fuller, runs Saltlik, a casual fine steakhouse chain.

Theme 
JOEY Restaurants has a casual fine dining theme. Each location is decorated with lighting fixtures, architecture, photos and decorations. The design of the restaurant is to cater to the locale and clientele of each restaurant location. Each restaurant is said to be custom-designed, catering again, to each location and its atmosphere. The ambiance of this restaurant is to be dimly lit.

Menu 

The restaurant is well known serving globally-inspired foods with a JOEY twist. The menu varies by location to cater to different clientele and locals. Appetizers include Chicken Lettuce Wraps, Hibachi Wings, and Korean Cauliflower. The restaurant offers a full bar with draft and bottled beers, wine, classic cocktails and non-alcoholic options. The lunch and dinner menu remain the same throughout the time the restaurant is open. The food menu has offerings such as smalls + sharings, sushi, salads, sandwiches + burgers, mains, steakhouse, and sweets. A signature side dish they offer is called Crispy Mashed Potatoes, a take on a spring roll combined with a loaded potato, topped with bacon, green onions, sour cream and cheese.

JOEY is well known for their Super Drinks, a classic cocktail offering of highballs such as gin and tonic, vodka and soda, or jack and coke with a lemon-lime slushy, called an Iceberg, on top. The Super Sonic Gin + Tonic is named after Seattle's SuperSonics basketball team, which is now nonexistent. The reason why these drinks are very popular is due to them being automatic double shots. Which is why the famous cocktail is called the "Super Drink".

The menu also offers vegetarian and gluten-wise options. There are vegan options that the kitchen can make as well.  caloric content and information is available online on the website.

Dress code 
Britt Innes, the Vice President for JOEY Restaurant Group, is responsible for the dress code for the company. The dress code revolves around having a neat, polished and consistent appearance, focusing on an all-black outfit. Partnered with Aritzia, female front of house staff wear black dresses or a mock-neck top with black pants. Male front of house staff wear black jeans and a black tee shirt.

Awards 
Joey was consistently recognized as one of the Best Places to Work Best Workplace in Canada for a consecutive nine years from 2010 to 2018. The company has also been awarded as one of the Top Employers for Young People. According to Forbes, the restaurant dropped off the list in 2019.

See also
 List of Canadian restaurant chains
 Earls (restaurant chain)
 Cactus Club Cafe

References

Restaurant chains in Canada
Restaurants established in 1992
Restaurant chains
Restaurant chains in the United States
Restaurant franchises
Theme restaurants
Restaurants in Vancouver